Violin Concerto in D major may refer to:
Violin Concerto (Beethoven)
Violin Concerto (Brahms)
Violin Concerto (Tchaikovsky)